Kolaportið is Iceland's only flea market.  It takes place indoors close to the harbour of the capital city, Reykjavík.  Goods sold include second-hand records, liquorice and fermented shark.  Kolaportið is open only during weekends.

Buildings and structures in Reykjavík
Flea markets
Retail markets in Iceland
Culture in Reykjavík